The Apuseni Mountains is a mountain range in Transylvania, Romania, which belongs to the Western Romanian Carpathians, also called Occidentali in Romanian. Their name translates from Romanian as Mountains "of the sunset", i.e., "western". The Apuseni Mountains have about 400 caves.

Geography

The Apuseni Mountains do not present an uninterrupted chain of mountains, but possess many low and easy passes towards the Crișana and the Pannonian Plain. Going from south to north the principal groups are: the Munții Metaliferi ("Ore Mountains") with the basaltic masses of the Detunata near Abrud; the Bihor Mountains, with numerous caverns, with the highest peak the Bihorul; to the east of this group are the Muntele Mare (highest peak ), to the southwest of Cluj-Napoca; the northernmost chain is the Seș and Meseș Mountains.

Boundaries
To the north: the Barcău River.
To the south: the Mureș River.
To the east: the Transylvanian Plateau.
To the west: the Crișana plains.

Subdivisions

Criș Mountains (Munţii Crișului) :
Criș Hills (Dealurile Crișene), including the Beiuș Depression (Depresiunea Beiuș) and the Vad Depression (Depresiunea Vad)
Pădurea Craiului Mountains (literally:Forest of the King)
Codru-Moma Mountains (Munții Codru-Moma)
Seș-Meseș Mountains (Munții Seș-Meseșului):
Meseș Mountains (Munții Meseșului)
Seș Mountains (Muntele Seș, also Plopiș)
Șimleu Depression (Depresiunea Șimleu Silvanei), often considered part of the Transylvanian Basin-Podişul Someşan
Șimleu Mountains (Munții Șimleu), often considered part of the Transylvanian Basin-Podişul Someşan
Bihor Massif (Masivul Bihor):
Bihor Mountains (Munții Bihorului)
Vlădeasa Mountains (Munții Vlădeasa)
Muntele Mare Mountains (literally: Big Mountain), (Munții Muntele Mare)
Gilău Mountains (Munții Gilăului)
Mureș Mountains (Munții Mureșului):
Zarand Mountains (Munții Zarandului)
Metalliferous Mountains (Munții Metaliferi)
Trascău Mountains (Munții Trascăului)

Gallery

See also 
 Țara Moților
 Apuseni Natural Park

References

External links

 Photos from Apuseni Mountains
 Tourist attractions in Apuseni Mountains
Website with information about the Carpathians Mountains
Apuseni Mountains - photographs + information in Czech
Pictures of the Apuseni Mountains
Awarded "EDEN - European Destinations of Excellence" non-traditional tourist destination 2009

Mountain ranges of Romania
Mountain ranges of the Western Romanian Carpathians
Western Romanian Carpathians